The 4th constituency of the Manche (French: Quatrième circonscription de la Manche) is a French legislative constituency in the Manche département. Like the other 576 French constituencies, it elects one MP using the two-round system, with a run-off if no candidate receives over 50% of the vote in the first round.

Description

The 4th Constituency of the Manche largely consists of the city of Cherbourg and the most northerly parts of the Cotentin Peninsula.

The seat was changed substantially as a result of the 2010 redistricting of French legislative constituencies, which removed one constituency from Manche. Manche's 5th constituency was abolished, and merged with the 4th constituency. This change resulted in Cherbourg being included in the seat and therefore radically changed its demographic make up.

Prior to the boundary changes the seat was reliably conservative, however subsequent elections have resulted in both PS and Independent gains.

Despite being elected as an independent and defeating the official En Marche! candidate Sonia Krimi subsequently joined their parliamentary group.

Anna Pic from NUPES defeated Krimi in 2022.

Assembly Members

Election results

2022

 
 
 
 
 
 
 
 
|-
| colspan="8" bgcolor="#E9E9E9"|
|-

2017

 
 
 
 
 
 
 
 
|-
| colspan="8" bgcolor="#E9E9E9"|
|-

2012

Won by Bernard Cazeneuve in the first round.

 
 
 
 
 
|-
| colspan="8" bgcolor="#E9E9E9"|
|-

References

4